Dylan Colter Gandy (born March 8, 1982) is an American football center who is currently a free agent. He was drafted by the Indianapolis Colts in the fourth round of the 2005 NFL Draft. He played college football at Texas Tech.

Gandy earned a Super Bowl ring with the Colts in Super Bowl XLI against the Chicago Bears. He has also played for the Denver Broncos, Oakland Raiders, Detroit Lions and the Bears.

Early years
Dylan Gandy attended Pflugerville High School in Pflugerville, Texas, where he lettered in football and track & field. In football, he was a two-way lineman, a first-team All-District pick, a first-team All-Central Texas pick, and also the team's long snapper.

College career
Gandy attended Texas Tech University. After redshirting as a true freshman, he started three games the following season. He finished his sophomore year as an All-Big 12 Academic first-teamer, and made the second-team the following year as a junior. Although he played mostly guard and tackle his first three seasons, he switched to center his senior year, where he started 12 games. He was selected to the All-Big 12 honorable mention team by the coaches in the conference.

Professional career

Indianapolis Colts
Gandy was drafted by the Indianapolis Colts in the fourth round (129th overall) of the 2005 NFL Draft. He was  released by the Colts on May 2, 2008.

Denver Broncos
On May 16, 2008, Gandy signed with the Denver Broncos. He was released on September 9, 2008. The Broncos re-signed Gandy on September 25 after center Tom Nalen was placed on injured reserve. He was released again on October 7 when the team re-signed tight end Chad Mustard.

Oakland Raiders
Gandy was signed by the Oakland Raiders on November 26, 2008 when wide receiver Javon Walker was placed on injured reserve. He was waived on December 4 to make room for practice squad wide receiver Johnathan Holland.

Detroit Lions
Gandy signed with the Detroit Lions on April 6, 2009. He played with the team until 2013.

Chicago Bears
The Chicago Bears signed Gandy to a one-year contract on July 25, 2014. The Bears released Gandy on August 23, 2014.

References

External links
Chicago Bears bio
Detroit Lions bio
Texas Tech Red Raiders bio

1982 births
Living people
People from Harlingen, Texas
Players of American football from Texas
American football centers
American football offensive guards
Texas Tech Red Raiders football players
Indianapolis Colts players
Denver Broncos players
Oakland Raiders players
Detroit Lions players
Chicago Bears players